The 2020–21 Segunda División B season was the 44th since its establishment and the last as the third tier. A total of 102 teams participated, and were distributed in three groups of 20 teams each and two groups of 21, with eight subgroups of ten teams each and two with eleven teams each. 

On 6 May 2020, the Royal Spanish Football Federation announced the expansion of the league to what were initially five groups of 20 teams each for the 2020–21 season due to promotion from the Tercera División groups in the curtailed past season being applied.

The season began on 18 October, following approval by each of Spain's autonomous regions' health departments. For next season the Segunda División B was demoted to the fourth level and dropped the B in its name in favour of the federation's Spanish initials RFEF on the creation of a new, two-group, 40-team third division called Primera División RFEF.

Overview before the season
102 teams joined the league, including four relegated from the 2019–20 Segunda División and 22 promoted from the 2019–20 Tercera División. No teams were relegated from the 2019–20 Segunda División B. The final groups were published on 31 August 2020.

Relegated from Segunda División
Deportivo La Coruña
Extremadura
Numancia
Racing Santander

Promoted from Tercera División'''

Alcoyano
Atzeneta
Betis Deportivo
Compostela
Covadonga
El Ejido
L'Hospitalet
Laredo
Lealtad
Linares
Lorca Deportiva
Marino
Mutilvera
Navalcarnero
Poblense
Portugalete
SD Logroñés
Socuéllamos
Tamaraceite
Tarazona
Villanovense
Zamora

First phase

Group 1

Teams and locations

Subgroup 1A

Subgroup 1B

Group 2

Teams and locations

Subgroup 2A

Subgroup 2B

Group 3

Teams and locations

Subgroup 3A

Subgroup 3B

Group 4

Teams and locations

Subgroup 4A

Subgroup 4B

Group 5

Teams and locations

Subgroup 5A

Subgroup 5B

Second phase
Each team from group A in the first phase played each group B team home and away.

Promotion groups (C)

Group 1C

Group 2C

Group 3C

Group 4C

Group 5C

Ranking of fourth-place teams

Primera División RFEF promotion groups (D)

Group 1D

Group 2D

Group 3D

Group 4D

Group 5D

Ranking of second-placed teams for Copa del Rey qualification

Segunda División RFEF relegation groups (E)

Group 1E

Group 2E

Group 3E

Group 4E

Group 5E

Ranking of third-place teams

References

External links
Royal Spanish Football Federation

 

 
2020-21
3
Spa